Bird on a Wire may refer to:

Film
Bird on a Wire (film), 1990 film starring Mel Gibson and Goldie Hawn
Leonard Cohen: Bird on a Wire, is a 1974 documentary, directed by Tony Palmer

Music
Bird on a Wire (Tim Hardin album), a 1971 album
Bird on a Wire (Toby Lightman album), a 2006 album
"Bird on the Wire", a song by Leonard Cohen, covered by various artists as "Bird on a Wire"